The 1875 Wisconsin gubernatorial election was held on November 2, 1875. Republican Party candidate Harrison Ludington was elected with 50% of the vote, narrowly defeating incumbent Democratic Governor William Robert Taylor.

Taylor was once again nominated as the consensus candidate of the "Reform Party,"—a coalition of Democrats, Liberal Republicans, and Grangers. He was opposed by Ludington, who disagreed with the regulations placed on railroads and in turn received the support of railroad companies. The reelection defeat of Taylor prompted the dissolution of the Reform coalition, with the Grangers standing their own candidate under the Greenback Party in the following election.

Democratic (Reform) Party
William Robert Taylor was the incumbent Governor of Wisconsin, having been elected in the 1873 election. Previously, he had served as Trustee for the State Hospital of the Insane, the President of the state agriculture society, had been chairman of the Cottage Grove town board, and the Dane County board of supervisors, and had been a member of the Wisconsin State Senate and Assembly.

Republican Party
Harrison Ludington, at the time of the 1875 election, served as Mayor of Milwaukee. Previously he had been elected as a Milwaukee alderman for two terms, having been a businessman working in merchandising, lumber and construction until then.

Results

| colspan="6" style="text-align:center;background-color: #e9e9e9;"| General Election, November 2, 1875

References

1875
Wisconsin
1875 Wisconsin elections